Hegge may refer to:

People
Inger Lise Hegge (born 1965), Norwegian cross-country skier
Olav Jørgen Hegge (died 2005), Norwegian fiddler and dancer
Ole Hegge (1898–1994), Norwegian cross-country skier
Per Egil Hegge (born 1940), Norwegian journalist
Robert Hegge (1599–1629), English academic and antiquary

Places
Hegge, India, a village in Uttara Kannada district, Karnataka, India
Hegge, Innlandet, a village in Øystre Slidre municipality in Innlandet county, Norway
Hegge Stave Church, a church in Øystre Slidre municipality in Innlandet county, Norway
Hegge, Limburg, a village in Limburg, Netherlands
Hegge, Netherlands, a village in Epe municipality, Gelderland, Netherlands

Other
Hegge cycle, a cycle of 42 medieval mystery plays

Norwegian-language surnames